Kalmandapam is a panchayat village in Nettapakkam Commune in the Union Territory of Puducherry, India.

Geography
Kalmandapam is bordered by Nettapakkam in the west, Earipakkam in the north,  Mitta Mandagapattu village(Tamil Nadu) in the east and Pandasozhanallur in the south

Transport
Kalmandapam is located at 24 km. from Puducherry. Kalmandapam can be reached directly by any bus running between Pondicherry and Maducarai

Road network
Kalmandapam is connected to Pondicherry by Mangalam-Maducarai State Highway (RC-19).

Following are the roads in Kalmandapam.

 Mangalam-Maducarai State Highway (RC-19)
 Kalmandapam - Pandasozhanallur road
 Kalmandapam - Earipakkam road
 Kalmandapam - Pandasozhanallur Erikarai road

Tourism

Malligarjunar Temple
Malligarjunar Temple, Pandasozhanallur is one of the ancient temple in Puducherry. It belongs to Chozha period.

Kalmandapam***
A Residing Place made with Rock stone along with temple beside make this name of village as kalmanadapam, also a pond is behind the mandapam,
Yearly temple festival is famous in this village.
A live pond is located near the Nagathamman temple which is with white Lilly and lotus inside it.

Kalmandapam has an arch gate entrance on east side of the village with two lions standing on the pillar holding the world(Globe),make the pride of the village.

Politics
Kalmandapam is a part of Nettapakkam (Union Territory Assembly constituency) which comes under Puducherry (Lok Sabha constituency)

References

External links
 Official website of the Government of the Union Territory of Puducherry

Villages in Puducherry district